Joseph Arthur Ankrah Born (18 August 1915 – 25 November 1992) was a Ghanaian army general who was the head of state of Ghana from 1966 to 1969 in the position of Chairman of the National Liberation Council. Before becoming head of state, Ankrah served as the first commander of the Ghana Army. He was Ghana's first military head of state. Ankrah also served as Chairperson of the Organisation of African Unity from 24 February 1966 to 5 November 1966.

Early life
Ankrah was born on 18 August 1915 in Accra to the Ga family of Samuel Paul Cofie Ankrah, an overseer for the Christian Missionary Society and Beatrice Abashie Quaynor, a trader. Ankrah began his schooling in 1921 at the Wesleyan Methodist School in Accra, where his nickname was 'Ankrah Patapaa' for his "forcefulness in arguments and always playing leadership role among his mates". In 1932, he entered Accra Academy, where he established himself as a good football player. He obtained the Senior Cambridge School Certificate in 1937. He then joined the Ghana Civil Service.

Ankrah obtained the Senior Cambridge School Certificate in 1937. He then joined the Ghana Civil Service.

Military career
Ankrah joined the Gold Coast Regiment in 1939. On the outbreak of World War II, Ankrah was mobilized into the Royal West African Frontier Force. While his Brigade was in East Africa in 1940, he was transferred to the Record Office in Accra with the rank of Warrant Officer Class II and made second-in-command. In October 1946, he went to the Marshfield Officer Cadets Training Unit in the United Kingdom and graduated in February 1947 as the first African officer in the Gold Coast Army. He was commissioned a lieutenant in 1947 and became the first African camp commandant at the Army Headquarters. He was later made the first Ghanaian Chief Instructor of the Education Unit. He was promoted Major in 1956 and became the first African to command an all-African company, the Charlie Company of the First Battalion at Tamale, Ghana. He later became Lieutenant Colonel and took over the whole battalion. He rose to the rank of colonel by 1960, at a time when there were few Ghanaian officers at that level. During the United Nations Operation in the Congo, he was the Brigade Commander of the force-based at Luluabourg, Kasai in the present-day Democratic Republic of Congo. He was the only Ghanaian awarded the Military Cross in Leopoldville for acts of unsurpassed gallantry in Congo in 1961. The citation read:

With great common sense, maturity and tact, this officer handled a delicate situation which otherwise would have created grave consequences in Leopoldville and many parts of the Congo. Colonel Ankrah, with complete disregard for his own life, disarmed an Armée Nationale Congolaise (ANC) soldier who, with a loaded sten machine carbine, attempted to shoot Mr. Lumumba. He carried the Prime Minister to safety in a vehicle which was fired on by ANC ambushers. Had it not been for the quick and bold action of Colonel Ankrah at the risk of his life, Mr. Lumumba's life would have been taken with untold consequences at that time.

After his experience in the Congo, he was promoted Brigadier then Major General becoming the first Ghanaian commander of the Ghana army in 1961 and then Deputy Chief of Defence Staff. He was dismissed from the Ghana army in July 1965 on suspicion of involvement in a coup plot.

Politics
Ankrah became the head of the National Investment Bank after leaving the army. However, he became the Head of state and Chairman of the National Liberation Council after the 24 February 1966 coup. In January 1967, he mediated between the warring factions of the Nigerian Civil War in Biafra.
He was forced to resign as Chairman of the NLC and Head of State over a bribery scandal involving a Nigerian businessman.

Sports
Ankrah served as the first ever President of the Council of Patrons of Accra Hearts of Oak S.C. and steered the football club for a long period.

Family
In 1965 he married his third wife, Mildred Christina Akosiwor Fugar (12 June 1938 – 9 June 2005), in Accra. His son also went to Accra Academy. He had a daughter called Jackie Ankrah who is a broadcaster, songwriter and musician. He had several wives and 18 children.

See also
National Liberation Council

References

External links
 Ghana-pedia webpage - Lieutenant-General Joseph A. Ankrah
Ghana-pedia webpage - Operation Cold Chop: The Fall Of Kwame Nkrumah

1915 births
1992 deaths
Chairpersons of the African Union
Ghanaian soldiers
Leaders who took power by coup
Heads of state of Ghana
Foreign ministers of Ghana
Defence ministers of Ghana
British colonial army soldiers
Alumni of the Accra Academy
People from Accra
Ga-Adangbe people
Royal West African Frontier Force officers
People of the Nigerian Civil War
People of the Congo Crisis
Chiefs of Army Staff (Ghana)
Ghanaian Methodists
Ghanaian Freemasons